San Pietro al Natisone (in the local dialect: ;) is a comune (municipality) in the Italian region Friuli-Venezia Giulia, located about  northwest of Trieste and about  northeast of Udine, and borders the following municipalities: Cividale del Friuli, San Leonardo, Savogna, Prepotto, Pulfero, and Torreano. Until 1878, its official name was San Pietro degli Slavi, that is "Saint Peter of the Slavs".

Ethnic composition

75.9% of the population were Slovenes according to the 1971 census.

Twin towns
San Pietro al Natisone is twinned with:

  Sambreville, Belgium

References

See also
Venetian Slovenia
Friuli
Slovene Lands

Cities and towns in Friuli-Venezia Giulia